Michael Wolf Duffy (born September 7, 1958) is a journalist and author. He is opinions editor at large for the Washington Post.

Life
Born and raised in Columbus, Ohio, Duffy graduated from Oberlin College in 1980.
He was a staff writer at Defense Week, and was Pentagon correspondent for Time, becoming Washington Bureau Chief from 1997 to 2005.
He was a Ferris Professor of Journalism at Princeton University in 2006-07.

He appears on Charlie Rose and Washington Week.

He is married to Demetra Lambros.

Awards and honors
1994 Gerald R. Ford award for distinguished reporting
1997 Joan Shorenstein Barone Prize for Investigative Journalism
1998 Goldsmith Prize for Investigative Reporting
2004 Gerald R. Ford award for distinguished reporting
2013 Chautauqua Prize, shortlist, The Presidents Club

Works

Michael Duffy, Dan Goodgame (1992). Marching in Place: the Status Quo Presidency of George Bush. Simon & Schuster. .

References

External links

Cathedral Gust - Michael Duffy, Washington National Cathedral.

C-SPAN Q&A interview with Duffy and Nancy Gibbs about The Presidents Club: Inside the World's Most Exclusive Fraternity, May 13, 2012

American male journalists
20th-century American journalists
Time (magazine) people
Oberlin College alumni
Living people
Writers from Columbus, Ohio
1958 births
21st-century American journalists
American political writers